Bargteheide (West Low German: Bartheil) is a town in the district of Stormarn, Schleswig-Holstein state, Germany. It is situated between the cities of Ahrensburg and Bad Oldesloe, on the Hamburg to Lübeck rail line and is part of the Hamburg Metropolitan Region.

The population of Bargteheide was 16,045 at the end of 2017.

Mayors
 1946–1957: Julius Gerken
 1957–1962: Enno Wilkens
 1962–1971: Karl Eduard Claussen (CDU)
 1971–1984: Erich Reincke
 1985–1996: Frank Pries
 1996–2008: Werner Mitsch
 2008–2016: Henning Görtz (CDU)
 since 2016: Birte Kruse-Gobrecht (independent)

Population development
1840: ca. 1.000
1905: 1.980
1914: 2.300
1949: 6.900
1970: 7.374
2002: 13.820
2008: 14.902
2009: 15.306
2012: 15.528
2013: 16.000
2015: 16.292

Notable people
 Luise Zietz (1865-1922), socialist politician
 Katharina Fegebank (born 1977), German politician (The Greens)
 David Kross (born 1990), German actor
 Axel Fischer (born 1981), German pop singer and actor
 Matti Steinmann (born 1995), Finnish-German footballer

International relations

Bargteheide is twinned with:
  Déville-lès-Rouen, France
  Żmigród, Poland

References

External links

http://www.bargteheide.de/

Stormarn (district)